The 2013 Canterbury-Bankstown Bulldogs season is the 79th in the club's history. Coached by Des Hasler and captained by Michael Ennis, they competed in the National Rugby League's 2013 Telstra Premiership. Finishing the regular season in 6th place (out of 16), they thus reached the finals for the second consecutive year. The Bulldogs were then knocked out in the first week of the finals by the Newcastle Knights.

Results

Squad

References

See also
 List of Canterbury-Bankstown Bulldogs seasons

Canterbury-Bankstown Bulldogs seasons
Canterbury-Bankstown Bulldogs season